Çayyaka

 Çayyaka, İliç
 Çayyaka, Sungurlu